The 2013 Navy Midshipmen football team represented the United States Naval Academy as an independent in the 2013 NCAA Division I FBS football season. The Midshipmen were led by sixth-year head coach Ken Niumatalolo and played their home games at Navy–Marine Corps Memorial Stadium.

Schedule

Roster

Depth chart
The following players comprised the team's Depth chart prior to the 2012 Kraft Fight Hunger Bowl:

Game Summaries

at Indiana

Delaware

at WKU

Air Force

at Duke

Toledo

Pittsburgh

at Notre Dame

Hawaii

South Alabama

at San Jose State

vs. Army

vs. Middle Tennessee (Bell Helicopter Armed Forces Bowl)

References

Navy
Navy Midshipmen football seasons
Armed Forces Bowl champion seasons
Navy Midshipmen football